Tsogt-Ovoo (mighty Ovoo) is a sum (district) of Ömnögovi Province in southern Mongolia. As of 2009 the population of the sum was 1,666, including 619 in the sum center.

Climate

Tsogt-Ovoo has a cold desert climate (Köppen climate classification BWk) with very warm summers and very cold winters. Most precipitation falls in the summer as rain. Winters are very dry.

References

Districts of Ömnögovi Province